Dabl is an American lifestyle-oriented digital multicast television network owned by the CBS Media Ventures subsidiary of Paramount Global, and was launched on September 9, 2019. The network focuses on topical lifestyle programming (including cooking, home renovation, home and interior design, do-it-yourself, pet care and travel series) aimed mainly at women between the ages of 25 and 54 years old. The network is available nationwide over-the-top via Paramount Global's internet television service Pluto TV on channel 614.

The following article is a list of current and pending affiliates of the network, organized in alphabetical order by state and then by market or city of license. If stations elect to disaffiliate from the network, then this article will also include a section listing former Dabl affiliates.

Current affiliates

Former affiliates

References

Dabi